Plato C. Fludd was a judge, public official, and politician in South Carolina.

He had lived in Charleston and had been enslaved. lived in Florence, South Carolina and was one of its first elected politicians. He also served in the state legislature. He represented Darlington County, South Carolina. He served as a judge and county treasurer. Governor Daniel H. Chamberlain dismissed him as a judge in 1875.

Governor Robert K. Scott appointed him as an election official in 1870. In 1875 the legislature passed an act allowing him to construct gates across a public lane running past his property.

See also
African-American officeholders during and following the Reconstruction era

References

Members of the South Carolina General Assembly
African-American politicians during the Reconstruction Era